Chamber Choir Ireland, formerly known as the National Chamber Choir of Ireland, is the Republic of Ireland's national choral ensemble and national chamber choir, and the only regularly funded professional choir in the country. Primarily funded by the Arts Council of Ireland, the choir is the resident ensemble at the National Concert Hall and Affiliated Artists to Dublin City University. Paul Hillier, has been the choir's Artistic Director since 2008.

The choir's repertoire spans from early Renaissance music to the present day. It also commissions new works by contemporary composers. In addition to its performances in Ireland and international tours, the choir has released recordings on the Harmonia Mundi, Orchid Classics, and RTÉ Lyric FM labels.

Chamber Choir Ireland is a member of the European network of professional chamber choirs, TENSO

Artistic directors

Paul Hillier (2008–present)
Celso Antunes (2002 –2007)
Colin Mawby, founding Artistic Director (1991–2001)

The Choir also regularly invites international guest conductors to work with the group, and since 2016 has worked with Sofi Jeannin, Grete Pedersen, Nils Schweckendiek and Jörg Widmann.

Commissions

Since its inception, Chamber Choir Ireland has regularly commissioned choral work by both Irish and international composers such as Gerald Barry, Ian Wilson, Andrew Hamilton, Siobhán Cleary, Tarik O'Regan, David Fennessy, Deirdre McKay and Jennifer Walshe.

Touring

Chamber Choir Ireland regularly tours throughout the island of Ireland, presenting choral concerts to audiences all around the country. Internationally, the Choir has toured extensively in Europe, Asia and North and South America including performances at the White House for President Barack Obama on St Patrick's Day 2011.

Learning & Participation
Chamber Choir Ireland has developed learning and participation programmes across the choral art form: Composers in the Classroom (for school children aged 15–18 to write new choral music), Axis SING (a community choir project in North County Dublin), Choral Music in Ireland: History and Evolution (a series of lectures on the history of choral music in Ireland) and Choral Sketches (a professional development programme for emerging Irish choral composers). Chamber Choir Ireland has also provided opportunities for young singers and conductors to participate in apprenticeship programmes.

Funding

Principal funding for Chamber Choir Ireland comes from the Arts Council /an Chomhairle Ealaíon, the Arts Council of Northern Ireland National Lottery Fund, and Dublin City Council.

Recordings
The choir's recordings include:
Gerard Victory: Ultima Rerum – Virginia Kerr (soprano), Bernadette Greevy (mezzo-soprano), Adrian Thompson (tenor), Alan Opie (baritone), RTÉ Philharmonic Choir, National Chamber Choir of Ireland, Cór na nÓg (children's choir), National Symphony Orchestra of Ireland, Colman Pearce (conductor). CD, 1994. Label: Naxos/Marco Polo.
White Stones – Secret Garden (ensemble), National Chamber Choir of Ireland, RTÉ Concert Orchestra, Fiachra Trench (conductor). CD, 1997. Label: Philips
One day fine (Irish choral music from the 14th to 21st centuries) – National Chamber Choir of Ireland, Paul Hillier (conductor). CD, 2011. Label: RTÉ Lyric FM
Tarik O'Regan: Acallam na senórach: an Irish colloquy – National Chamber Choir of Ireland, Stewart French (guitar), Paul Hillier (conductor). CD, 2011. Label: Harmonia Mundi
Carols from the Old and New Worlds, Vol. 3 – Chamber Choir Ireland, Fergal Caulfield (chamber organ), Paul Hillier (conductor). CD, 2014. Label: Harmonia Mundi.
Choirland: an anthology of Irish choral music (scores for 15 pieces by Irish composers for unaccompanied mixed choir with accompanying CD) – National Chamber Choir of Ireland, Paul Hillier (conductor). CD, 2014. Publisher: Contemporary Music Centre (Dublin)
Barry Meets Beethoven (works by Gerald Barry) – Stephen Richardson (bass), Chamber Choir Ireland, Crash Ensemble, Paul Hillier (conductor). CD, 2016. Label: Orchid Classics

References

External links
 
Dervan, Michael (23 February 2007). "National Chamber Choir must be championed". The Irish Times
Chamber Choir Ireland on WorldCat

Irish choirs
National choirs
1991 establishments in Ireland
Dublin City University
Irish culture
Musical groups established in 1991